Bob Bell (22 June 1953 – 12 October 2010) was an  Australian rules footballer who played with South Melbourne in the Victorian Football League (VFL).

Notes

External links 

1953 births
2010 deaths
Australian rules footballers from Victoria (Australia)
Sydney Swans players